The 2015–16 Puebla F.C. season was the club's 69th professional season in Mexico's top-flight football league. The season is split into two tournaments—the Torneo Apertura and the Torneo Clausura—each with identical formats and each contested by the same eighteen teams. The club also played Supercopa MX and Copa Libertadores.

First-team squad

 
For recent transfers, see List of Mexican football transfers summer 2015.

Supercopa MX

Match details

Puebla won its first Supercopa MX and the third overall edition .

Regular season

Apertura 2015 results

Goalscorers

Results

Results summary

Apertura 2015 Copa MX

Group stage

Apertura results

Goalscorers

Results

Results by round

2016

Regular season

Clausura 2016 results

Attendance 
Puebla's Home Attendance by round, Estadio Cuahutemoc  has a sitting capacity of 51,726 . 
|}

Goalscorers

Results

Results summary

Pre Libertadores 2016

After Santos laguna reached the Clausura 2015 final, Puebla earned a passed to the Copa Libertadores 2016 due to Santos pass to the 2016 Concachampions Cup. On December 22, 2015 the Conmebol will have the lottery in Paraguay in order to define Puebla's rival. Due to fellow Mexican club Tigres  who is the 2015 Runner up, Puebla won the right to home advantage in the series that will award 1st stage participation .

Relegation 2015 - 2016 

Last update: 21 November 2015

References

Puebla F.C. seasons
Puebla